Mister Kerala is a 1969 Indian Malayalam film, directed by G. Viswanath and produced by Muhammad Assam.  The film had musical score by Vijayakrishnamoorthy.

Cast
 Prem Nazir
 Sheela
 Adoor Bhasi

Soundtrack
The music was composed by Vijayakrishnamoorthy and the lyrics were written by P. Bhaskaran.

References

External links
 

1969 films
1960s Malayalam-language films